John Joseph Hearne (189329 March 1969) was an Irish legal scholar and diplomat who was referred to as "Ireland's Thomas Jefferson" for his role in the drafting of the 1937 Constitution of Ireland.

Biography

John Hearne was the youngest son of Alderman Richard Hearne, a member of the Irish Parliamentary Party, who twice served as Mayor of Waterford, and Alice Mary Hearne (née Power). His older brother Canon Maurice Hearne served as parish priest in Cahir.

Hearne attended Waterpark College (Christian Brothers). He went to train for the priesthood at St. John's College, Waterford transferring in 1911 to Maynooth College after a year. Here he completed a BA degree in Arts and Philosophy from National University of Ireland, enrolling in a Theology Degree which he didn't complete. He left in 1916 having decided not to become a priest, and studied for the degree of barrister at law at the King's Inns.
He also studied law at University College Dublin being awarded an LLB Degree.

In 1937, during the government of Éamon de Valera, he was working as a legal expert in the Department of External Affairs when de Valera called on him to assist in the writing of the new constitution, which would replace the 1922 Constitution of the Irish Free State. With Maurice Moynihan, Hearne drew up the first draft of the constitution; according to Moynihan, Hearne had been instrumental in convincing de Valera that a new constitution was necessary in the first place. The exact role of Hearne is not evident from the remaining documents; it is not clear who actually wrote the first draft, and according to the Irish historian John Joseph Lee, "Much remains to be uncovered about the planning and drafting of the constitution, including not least the roles of John Hearne, the legal adviser to External Affairs, and of Maurice Moynihan."

After his legal career, Hearne filled a number of diplomatic positions. In 1939, he was appointed High Commissioner to Canada. In March 1950, he became the first Irish ambassador to the United States, and was welcomed in Boston on 13 May 1950. He began the tradition of presenting a bowl of shamrock to the White House on St Patrick's Day.  In 1954, he gave the commencement address at Boston College, and on that occasion was awarded with an honorary degree. In 1960, after retiring from the diplomatic service, he became a legislative consultant to Nigeria and Ghana, which had recently acquired independence, albeit within the Commonwealth.

He died in Dublin in 1969. On the occasion of the 70th anniversary of the Irish constitution, Hearne's birthplace (8 William Street in Waterford) was marked with a tribute.

A bust of Hearne by Elizabeth O'Kane was unveiled in Waterford on 3 July 2017 on the 80th anniversary of the constitution. There is a replica  in the Irish Embassy, Washington D.C. and a replica stands in the garden of Iveagh House, headquarters of the Irish Department of Foreign Affairs.

A biography of Hearne, "John Hearne: Architect of the 1937 Constitution of Ireland" by Eugene Broderick was published in 2017.

References

1893 births
1969 deaths
20th-century Irish people
Irish legal scholars
Alumni of the National University of Ireland
Alumni of St Patrick's College, Maynooth
Alumni of University College Dublin
High Commissioners of Ireland to Canada
Ambassadors of Ireland to the United States
Irish diplomats
People educated at Waterpark College
Alumni of King's Inns